Calceolaria spruceana is a species of plant in the Calceolariaceae family. It is endemic to Ecuador.

References

spruceana
Endemic flora of Ecuador
Vulnerable flora of South America
Taxonomy articles created by Polbot
Taxa named by Friedrich Wilhelm Ludwig Kraenzlin